Ximena Herrera (born Carla Ximena Herrera Bowles on October 5, 1979 in La Paz, Bolivia) is a Bolivian actress.

She has acted in telenovelas such as La madrastra and Corazones al límite. She was married to Alex Sirvent but they divorced in December 2013.

Filmography

Awards and nominations

References

External links 
 
 Ximena Herrera at the esmas

1979 births
Living people
Mexican telenovela actresses
Mexican film actresses
Bolivian film actresses
Bolivian telenovela actresses
21st-century Mexican actresses
Naturalized citizens of Mexico
Bolivian emigrants to Mexico
People from La Paz